Pilea nummulariifolia is a perennial evergreen herbaceous plant commonly known as creeping charlie native to the Caribbean (including Florida) and northern South America.  It can be grown indoors, for example in a hanging pot.

References

nummulariifolia